Ramazan Sarlybekuly Orazov (Ramazan Sarlybekūly Orazov; born 30 January 1998) is a Kazakhstani football player who plays for Aksu.

Club career
On 18 July 2019, he scored a goal in added time for FC Kairat in the return leg of the Europa League first qualifying round to help Kairat advance against NK Široki Brijeg to the second round.

He made his debut in the Russian Football National League for FC Chayka Peschanokopskoye on 9 September 2020 in a game against FC Torpedo Moscow.

On 13 July 2021, Orazov signed for Aktobe. On January 27, 2023 Orazov signed a contract with Aksu.

International career
He made his debut for Kazakhstan national football team on 31 March 2021 in a World Cup qualifier against Ukraine.

Honours

Club
Kairat
Kazakhstan Cup: 2018.

References

External links
 
 Profile by Russian Football National League
 

1998 births
Sportspeople from Almaty
Living people
Kazakhstani footballers
Kazakhstan youth international footballers
Kazakhstan under-21 international footballers
Association football midfielders
FC Kairat players
BFC Daugavpils players
FC Aktobe players
Kazakhstan Premier League players
Latvian Higher League players
Kazakhstani expatriate footballers
Expatriate footballers in Latvia
Expatriate footballers in Russia
Kazakhstan international footballers
FC Chayka Peschanokopskoye players